Mr. Joy is an album led by jazz pianist Paul Bley recorded in the studio and in concert in Seattle in 1968 and released on the Limelight label.

Reception

Allmusic awarded the album 4 stars stating: "in the case of this particular recording the more concise performances have proven to be like mother of pearl found on the beach".

Track listing
 "Only Lovely" (Paul Bley) - 6:20   
 "Kid Dynamite" (Annette Peacock) - 3:10
 "Nothing Ever Was, Anyway" (Peacock) - 5:44   
 "El Cordobes" (Peacock) - 6:04   
 "Ramblin'" (Ornette Coleman) - 4:44   
 "Touching" (Peacock) - 4:49   
 "Blood" (Peacock) - 6:10   
 "Mr. Joy" (Peacock) - 3:50

Personnel 
Paul Bley - piano
Gary Peacock - bass  
Billy Elgart - drums

References 

1968 albums
Paul Bley albums
Limelight Records albums